San Benito Abad is a town and municipality located in the Sucre Department, northern Colombia.

References
 Gobernacion de Sucre - San Benito Abad
 San Benito Abad official website

Sucre